The Lancashire flag is the flag of the historic county of Lancashire.

The Red Rose of Lancaster is a symbol for the House of Lancaster, immortalised in the verse "In the battle for England's head/York was white, Lancaster red" (referring to the 15th century War of the Roses).

An unofficial Lancashire flag, a red rose on a white field, was never registered. When an attempt was made to register it with the Flag Institute, it was found that this flag had already been registered by the town of Montrose, Angus, several hundred years earlier with the Lyon Office. As the Flag Institute will not register two flags of the same design within the United Kingdom, Lancashire's official flag was registered — in 2008 — as a red rose on a gold field. The background was chosen as it, along with red, are the livery colours of the county.

Flag design
The Pantone colors for the flag are: yellow, 116; red, 485; dark red, 201; and green, 354.

References

Lancashire
Lancashire
Lancashire